Riya Bamniyal is an Indian actress who has appeared in Hindi and Tamil films. She made her film debut with the 2009 Tamil film, Kulir 100°. She won the third season of Indian reality television show, Splitsvilla, before making her debut in Hindi with Y-Films' Luv Ka The End in 2011.

Filmography

Television 
Splitsvilla (2009 - 2010)
Yeh Hai Aashiqui (2013 - 2016)

See also 
 Unnati Davara

References

Indian film actresses
Tamil actresses
Actresses from Mumbai
Living people
Female models from Mumbai
Year of birth missing (living people)